Dario Niccodemi (Livorno, Italy, 27 January 1874 – Rome, Italy, 24 September 1934) was a novelist and a playwright who was born in Italy.

Life and career
He spent his youth in Buenos Aires; he met the French actress Rejane in 1900, became her secretary and translated and adapted for her several Italian works. In this way, he learned techniques which he used later on, beginning with L'aigrette (comedy in three acts, 1912).

His comedies represent the bourgeois drama in an ironic and sentimental way, in which his characters are modelled on the society of the beginning of the century.

He founded a theater company in 1921, wrote novels (Il romanzo di scampolo) and two opera librettos, a scampolo with music by Camussi, and another, La ghibellina, with music by Bianchi.

He has written several plays and screenplays, including Scampolo (film, 1928), La nemica, L'alba, il giorno, la notte, La maestrina (film, 1942). About La nemica he said: "The actress Paola Pezzaglia was perhaps the best Nemica on stage". He carried out the first performance of Six Characters in Search of an Author by Luigi Pirandello at Teatro Valle in Rome. Among his fans was Leo Tolstoy, who wrote to prefer La nemica by Niccodemi to Pirandello's dramas of and to Verga's novels.

Other works
 Teatrino, three one-act volumes
first volume includes:
Lettera smarrita
Il poeta
Festa di beneficenza
second volume includes:
Fricchi
Le tre Grazie
L'incognita
third volume includes:
Scena vuota
La pelliccia
Natale.
Tempo passato, con 17 ritratti
Il rifugio, three-act play
I Pescicani, three-act play
L'ombra, three-act play
Il Titano, three-act play
Prete Pero, three-act play
La volata, three-act play
L'alba, il giorno, la notte, three-act play
Acidalia, three-act play
La casa segreta, three-act play
La piccina, three-act play
La Madonna, three-act play

Notes

Bibliography
Dario Niccodemi, Teatrino volume I (Lettera smarrita-Il Poeta-Festa di beneficenza) commedie in un atto, Milano, Fratelli Treves Editori, Quinto migliaio, 1929
Dizionario Enciclopedico Universale, Casa Editrice Le Lettere, 1981
Nuova Enciclopedia Universale, Alberto Peruzzo Editore, C.E.I., 1967

External links

1874 births
1934 deaths
Italian male dramatists and playwrights
Italian male novelists
Italian theatre directors
20th-century Italian dramatists and playwrights
Italian opera librettists
20th-century Italian male writers